Ricky Jones (born March 9, 1955) is a former professional American football player who played linebacker for seven seasons for the Cleveland Browns and Baltimore Colts.

References

1955 births
American football linebackers
Cleveland Browns players
Baltimore Colts players
Tuskegee Golden Tigers football players
Living people
Players of American football from Birmingham, Alabama